The Nierenberg Prize for Science in the Public Interest is given annually by the Scripps Institution of Oceanography. It was created through a gift of the family to honor the memory of William Nierenberg. The prize includes a bronze medal and $25,000.

The award is named for William Nierenberg (1919–2000), a renowned national science leader who served Scripps Institution of Oceanography as director from 1965 to 1986. The recipient of numerous awards and honors for professional research and public service, Nierenberg was a leading expert in several fields of underwater research and warfare, and was known for his work in low-energy nuclear physics.

Recipients
Source:

2001: E. O. Wilson
2002: Walter Cronkite
2003: Jane Lubchenco
2004: Dame Jane Goodall
2005: Sir David Attenborough
2006: Gordon Moore
2007: John Craig Venter
2008: James E. Hansen
2009: Richard Dawkins
2010: Ira Flatow
2012: Daniel Pauly
2013: James Cameron
2014: Michael Pollan
2015: Lord Martin Rees
2017: Charles Bolden
2018: Svante Pääbo
2019: Jennifer Doudna
2021: Warren Washington

2022: Jesse H. Ausubel

See also 

 List of general science and technology awards

References

External links

Nierenberg
American science and technology awards
Awards established in 2001